is a 2010 Japanese medical drama film directed by Izuru Narushima. The film was nominated for Best Picture at the 34th Japan Academy Prize.

Cast 
 Shinichi Tsutsumi as Dr. Toma
 Yui Natsukawa as Ryoko Nakamura
 Hisashi Yoshizawa
 Noriko Nakagoshi
 Yutaka Matsushige
 Hiroki Narimiya as Nakamura's adult son
 Kenichi Yajima
 Mitsuru Hirata
 Kimiko Yo
 Katsuhisa Namase
 Akira Emoto

Reception 
Critics praised Shinichi Tsutsumi's "always excellent" acting and Yui Natuskawa's "superbly modulated performance". Others criticized the story: "Though somewhat melodramatic, and with a highly convoluted story rife with subplots, the film has enough intensity to keep its momentum going."

References

2010 films
2010s Japanese-language films
Japanese drama films
2010 drama films
2010s Japanese films